Aldo Benítez (born 30 January 1996) is a Mexican footballer who plays as a left-back for Spanish club Fútbol Alcobendas Sport.

Club career

Deportivo Toluca 
On 6 August 2014, Benítez made his officially debut with Toluca, in a Copa MX match against CF Mérida.
Benítez was registered with the first squad of Deportivo Toluca for the 2014-15 Liga MX season although he didn't have any minutes.

Honours
Mexico U20
CONCACAF U-20 Championship: 2015

References

External links
 

1996 births
Living people
Footballers from the State of Mexico
People from Toluca
Association football fullbacks
Mexican expatriate footballers
Mexico under-20 international footballers
2015 CONCACAF U-20 Championship players
Deportivo Toluca F.C. players
CD Paracuellos Antamira players
Liga MX players
Tercera División players
Segunda División B players
Mexican expatriate sportspeople in Spain
Expatriate footballers in Spain
Mexican footballers